The 1930–31 Bradford City A.F.C. season was the 24th in the club's history.

The club finished 10th in Division Two, and reached the 4th round of the FA Cup.

Sources

References

Bradford City A.F.C. seasons
Bradford City